Whitley is a civil parish in Cheshire West and Chester, England. Apart from the settlements of Higher and Lower Whitley, the parish is entirely rural.  It contains 16 buildings that are recorded in the National Heritage List for England as designated listed buildings.  Most of these are houses, or buildings associated with farms.  The other structures are a church with a sundial in the churchyard, a public house, a boundary stone, and the wall around a former burial ground.

Key

Buildings

References

Citations

Sources

Listed buildings in Cheshire West and Chester
Lists of listed buildings in Cheshire